The Bardi Madonna or Madonna and Child with Saint John the Baptist and Saint John the Evangelist is a 1480s tempera on panel painting by Sandro Botticelli, now in the Gemäldegalerie, Berlin. Its primary name derives from the rich Florentine banker Agnolo Bardi who commissioned it for his family chapel at the Santo Spirito Basilica in Florence. It was completed around the end of 1485.

It includes several symbols of Mary's virginity (the hortus conclusus in the background), purity (white lilies), her sinless state (the white flowers in the 'mystic vase' at the foot of her throne) and her status as a new Venus (myrtle). The red flowers in the vase also allude to Christ's Passion and to the two Johns' martyrdoms, whilst the olive and laurel branches refer to the mystery of the Incarnation.The ascetic character of the figure of Mary shows Savonarola's influence on the artist.

See also 

 List of works by Sandro Botticelli

References

Paintings of the Madonna and Child by Sandro Botticelli
1485 paintings
Paintings in the Gemäldegalerie, Berlin
Paintings depicting John the Baptist
Paintings depicting John the Apostle